Fernando Carlos Redondo Neri (born 6 June 1969) is an Argentine retired footballer.

A defensive midfielder with the ability to contribute offensively and creatively, he turned professional playing for Argentinos Juniors and played one full decade in La Liga, for CD Tenerife and Real Madrid, then finished his career (curtailed by several injury problems) in Italy, with Milan. With Real Madrid, he won two La Liga championships and as many Champions League trophies, adding the 2003 Champions League with Milan.

Redondo was a member of the Argentina national team in the 1990s, representing the nation in the 1994 World Cup, and also winning the 1992 King Fahd Cup and the 1993 Copa América.

Club career

Early years / Tenerife
Born in Adrogué, Buenos Aires Province, Redondo played his first game in the Primera División at only 16 for Argentinos Juniors, and remained five years with the team before moving abroad to Spain.

Redondo made his debut in La Liga with CD Tenerife, under the management of countryman Jorge Solari. During this period, Real Madrid twice lost the league title to arch-rivals FC Barcelona on the final day of the season, in matches against Tenerife who were managed by Jorge Valdano and, when the coach was appointed at Real Madrid in the summer of 1994, the player also made the move for a fee of US$5 million.

Real Madrid
The key years of Redondo's career were spent at Real Madrid, where he won two league championships and the UEFA Champions League in 1998 and 2000. During the second victorious campaign in the latter competition, his performances won him the competition's Most Valuable Player award, with new coach Vicente del Bosque utilising him in a midfield combination with Steve McManaman. In the quarter-finals against Manchester United at Old Trafford, he was the author of a spectacular play in which he dribbled past Henning Berg by backheeling the ball around him, recovering it and assisting Raúl for his side's third goal (3–2 win, 3–2 on aggregate); after the game, opposing manager Alex Ferguson said "What does this player have in his boots? A magnet?”. For his performances, he was subsequently voted the Champions League and UEFA Club Footballer of the Year footballer of the year.

During his time in Madrid, Redondo earned the nickname El Principe ("The Prince"). In April 2013 he was named by daily newspaper Marca as a member of the "Best foreign eleven in Real Madrid's history", and four years later was selected by its readers to the club's all-time XI; during one full decade, he amassed Spanish top division totals of 268 games and 12 goals.

Milan
In 2000, Redondo transferred to Serie A club A.C. Milan in a controversial £11m move: he stated that he was not involved in transfer discussions and expressed his desire to stay at Madrid. In response, a section of Real Madrid supporters gathered outside the Santiago Bernabéu Stadium protesting the transfer. However, he suffered a serious knee injury in one of his first training sessions for his new team, and was unable to play for the next  years; he suspended his £2.74m-a-year salary, and even tried to give back the house and car which the Milan board had given him.

Redondo did manage to contribute (albeit in a peripheral role) to Milan's successes in the 2002–03 and 2003–04 seasons, making a combined 16 league appearances and adding five in the 2002–03 Champions League and six in the same edition of the Coppa Italia, including the two-legged final. In late 2004, at the age of 35, he retired from professional football following another knee injury.

International career
Redondo earned 29 caps for Argentina, the bulk of his appearances coming from 1992 to 1994 while Alfio Basile was the manager. His first appearance was on 18 June 1992, in a 2–0 friendly win over Australia.

Redondo turned down a call-up to the national team just before the 1990 FIFA World Cup, when it was coached by Carlos Salvador Bilardo. The player excused himself on account of not wanting to interrupt his law studies, but it was also reported that he objected to Bilardo's defensive strategy. Redondo later explained: "I was picked for Argentina's World Cup squad in 1990 but I knew I wasn't going to be in the starting line-up, I would just be another squad member, so I preferred to stay home."

In the 1994 World Cup, Redondo started in all of Argentina's matches, but was unable to prevent the country from falling 2–3 to Romania in the round of 16. Following the tournament in the United States he refused to play under Daniel Passarella who had banned long hair, earrings and homosexuals in his squad, leading to disputes with several players. The former refused the latter's demand to cut his hair, and was left out of the national team as even Diego Maradona and president Carlos Menem went on to take sides in the situation.

Passarella excluded Redondo from his 1998 World Cup squad, stating: "Twice he was asked to play for the national team and twice he refused and gave a different reason each time. Then he announced publicly he did not want to play for the national team and I do not pick any player who does not want to play for Argentina." The player later explained: "I was in great form. But he had particular ideas about discipline and wanted me to have my hair cut. I didn't see what that had to do with playing football so I said no again."

In 1999, when Argentina was managed by Marcelo Bielsa, Redondo was recalled to the national side for two exhibition matches with Brazil. Although he was chosen Player of the match in the 2–0 victory in Buenos Aires he refused any subsequent call-ups, preferring to focus on club football; in 2015, he was included in an all-time team by the Argentine Football Association.

Style of play
An elegant deep-lying playmaker who played in front of the defence, Redondo's main attributes were his creative passing, vision, technique and close control with his left foot, his ability to control the tempo of his team's play in midfield making him a key member of the Real Madrid side of the 90s. Despite not having a great deal of pace, he possessed good acceleration and was an efficient and aggressive tackler, who contributed defensively just as much as he did offensively.

Although he was regarded as one of the greatest midfielders of his generation, Redondo's career was also largely marked by injuries, in particular during the final years of his career.

Personal life
Redondo was born into an industrialist family and enjoyed a wealthy upbringing, later studying law at university in the early years of his playing career. He married the cousin of fellow footballer Santiago Solari, and his sons Federico and Fernando Jr. were also involved in the sport.

An avid reader, Redondo counted Jorge Luis Borges and Gabriel García Márquez as his two favourite authors.

Career statistics

Club

Honours

Club
Real Madrid
La Liga: 1994–95, 1996–97
UEFA Champions League: 1997–98, 1999–2000
Intercontinental Cup: 1998

Milan
Serie A: 2003–04
Coppa Italia: 2002–03
UEFA Champions League: 2002–03

International
Argentina
Copa América: 1993
FIFA Confederations Cup: 1992
South American Under-17 Football Championship: 1985

Individual
FIFA Confederations Cup: Golden Ball 1992
FIFA XI: 1996
Tenerife Player of The Year: 1992–93, 1993–94
Real Madrid Player of The Year: 1996–97, 1999–2000
ESM Team of the Year: 1997–98
Trofeo EFE: Player of The Decade 1990–99
UEFA Club Footballer of the Year: 1999–2000
Argentine Football Association: All-Time XI

References

External links

SuperFutbol biography 
Futbol Factory biography 

1969 births
Living people
People from Adrogué
People from Buenos Aires Province
Argentine footballers
Association football midfielders
Argentine Primera División players
Argentinos Juniors footballers
La Liga players
CD Tenerife players
Real Madrid CF players
Serie A players
A.C. Milan players
UEFA Champions League winning players
UEFA Men's Player of the Year Award winners
Argentina youth international footballers
Argentina international footballers
1992 King Fahd Cup players
1993 Copa América players
1994 FIFA World Cup players
FIFA Confederations Cup-winning players
Copa América-winning players
Argentine expatriate footballers
Expatriate footballers in Spain
Expatriate footballers in Italy
Argentine expatriate sportspeople in Spain
Argentine expatriate sportspeople in Italy
Sportspeople from Buenos Aires Province